Andean Group is a trade organization in Lima, Peru. In 1969, Bolivia, Chile, Colombia, Ecuador, and Peru established the group by the Treaty of Cartagena. In 1973, Venezuela joined. Chile quit in 1976, as did Peru in 1992. The group created a free trade area called the Andean Pact in 1992.

External links 
OAS description

Trade blocs
International trade organizations

ru:Андское сообщество